Gour Malda railway station is a railway station on the Howrah–New Jalpaiguri line of Malda railway division of Eastern Railway zone. It is situated at Purana Guamalati, Malda City of Malda district in the Indian state of West Bengal. Total 8 passenger trains stop at Gour Malda railway station. This railway station serves the Mohadipur and Gauḍa (city) area.

References

Railway stations in Malda district
Malda railway division